Chiloglottis trapeziformis, commonly known as the broad-lip bird orchid, diamond ant orchid or dainty bird-orchid, is a species of orchid endemic to south-eastern Australia. It has two narrow leaves and a narrow, greenish to purplish or brownish flower with a short, shiny black, ant-like callus covering the lower quarter of the diamond-shaped labellum. It has been recorded as a vagrant in New Zealand.

Description
Flowering occurs from August to November.

Taxonomy and naming
Chiloglottis trapeziformis was first formally described in 1877 by Robert D. FitzGerald and the description was published in his book Australian Orchids from a specimen collected "at Liverpool".

Distribution and habitat
The broad-lip bird orchid is widespread and common in sheltered sites in a wide range of habitats. It occurs in south-eastern Queensland, eastern New South Wales and eastern Victoria. There is a single small population in south-eastern South Australia and scattered populations at Wynyard, Launceston, Flinders Island and Great Dog Island in Tasmania. A single vagrant population, now extinct, was known from a pine plantation near Levin in New Zealand.

Conservation
Chiloglottis trapeziformis is listed as "endangered" in Tasmania under the Threatened Species Protection Act 1995.

References

External links 

trapeziformis
Orchids of New South Wales
Orchids of Victoria (Australia)
Orchids of Queensland
Orchids of South Australia
Orchids of Tasmania
Plants described in 1877